The National Eagle Scouts Association of the Philippines otherwise known as the “NESAPh” is the Premiere Honor Society of Eagle Scouts in the Philippines. It is a voluntary, non-political, non-sectarian and non-profit association of Eagle Scouts supporting the causes of Scouting and the thrusts of the Boy Scouts of the Philippines in accordance with the ideals, purpose and principles, and methods conceived by the Founder of Scouting.

History 

Burdened by the need for a service organization that would unite like-minded Eagle Scouts in his hometown, Paolo Cruz approached Lyel Lim for help in holding ceremonies for a new Brotherhood of Eagle Scouts. The initial Rituals held in Calumpit, Bulacan on 24 February 2018 borrowed from the other group ideals, practices, and ceremonies in a hodge-podge manner, producing the initial batch of 34 members.

Four days after, Paolo Cruz proposed that the group will be called as the National Eagle Scouts Association of the Philippines or NESAPh, the Premiere Honor Society of Eagle Scouts in the Philippines.

On March 14–29, 2018, Lyel and Paolo authored a new monitor and script of accepting new members which was later called as the Acceptance Rites. On March 22, 2018, Lyel Lim finalized the NESAPh's logo.

From the success and progress of latter events, and seeing the need for a similar group being formed in his hometown, Lyel Lim reached out to his friends from the now almost-defunct organization and association of Eagle Scouts. And so, during the ATAS Gathering held at the PICC on 18 October 2019, this reached-out group of Eagle Scouts finalized plans for the second ceremony to be held in San Mateo, Rizal on 24 November 2019. Armed with the success and the promise of bigger and better things to come, NESAPh set forth to consolidate Eagle Scouts from all over the Philippines under its banner. Meanwhile, Jacobb Caones called for a Gathering of Eagle Scouts in his hometown of Quezon City on 10 February 2019, which proved to be a dismal failure in that he realized that working with the old Eagle groups would be futile. All efforts would then be poured into this new energetic group of dynamic Eagle Scouts.

The third rituals would then be held in Intramuros, which the first time NESAPh accepted female Eagle Scouts as members, followed by the fourth rituals in Chiang Kai Shek College, Manila which would also be the commemoration of the 11th Anniversary of an Eagle Scout Assembly in Olongapo. NESAPh further spread its wings by holding 5th Rituals in Tacloban, and successive rituals in Camarines Sur, Bacolod City, Cabanatuan, and City of Cagayan de Oro from September to November 2019- thus proving that they are a National Association.

After the successful travels of NESAPh, accomplishing its membership growth, the Association had its 1st General Assembly and Conclave on 28 February – 1 March 2020 held at in Bulacan which became an avenue to receive almost one hundred Eagle Scouts from Nueva Ecija to Cotabato, ratified the Association's Constitution and By Laws, elect the new set of National Officers, and accepted new members who came from the different islands of the Philippine archipelago.

National Executive Committee (2020-2023) 

* Appointee of the National President as mandated by NESAPh's Constitution and Bylaws.

Support from the Boy Scouts of the Philippines 
The paramount success of NESAPh was achieved because of the continued support being given by the Boy Scouts of the Philippines, viz:

  BSP and NESAPh Memorandum of Agreement Signing (National Executive Board Room, BSP National Headquarters | 4 October 2019)
 BSP informing all concerned about BSP and NESAPh’s partnership (BSP National Office Memo No. 05, s. 2020 | 27 January 2020)
 BSP endorsing NESAPh’s 1st General Assembly and Conclave, and highly encouraging the participation of Eagle Scouts from different Local Councils (BSP National Office Memo No. 06, s. 2020 | 27 January 2020)

Membership process 
NESAPh is an association of Eagle Scouts who welcomes those who wishes to continue their service and commitment to Scouting. All former Senior Scouts who earned the Eagle Scout rank and its equivalent (Jose Rizal Scout and the Scout Citizen Awardee) shall require showing proof of achievement prior to invitation and nomination for membership.

The Association is open to all registered members of the Boy Scouts of the Philippines who have successfully earned the highest rank in Senior Scouting which is the Eagle Scout rank.

The Association ensures and see to it that candidates and nominees for membership shall subscribe to the Fundamental Principles of Scouting based on his/her own free will, as well as the acceptance of Scouting's declaration of its Religious Policy governing membership.

The Association shall only accept members based on invitation and/or nomination of bona fide members in good standing and shall be subjected to deliberation for recommendation of the Membership Committee and approval of the National Officers.  

All interested Eagle Scouts who have been invited and or nominated for membership shall be subjected to membership verification as to the authenticity of his/her qualification as official and legitimate Eagle Scout awardee or its equivalent rank.

The process of membership by nomination aims to measure commitment to actively participate in our activities. NESAPh doesn't want huge number of members with very few active members. While Scouting, remains to be open for all, and primarily based on free will and volunteerism, NESAPh adheres to carefully select Eagle Scouts who wish to take active involvement in Leadership and Service, thus, requires expressed commitment, and careful selection thru nomination.

NESAPh Chapters

Established Chapters: 

 Marcelo H. Del Pilar Chapter No. 1 (Est. 24 February 2018)
 Jose Protacio Rizal Chapter No. 2 (Est. 24 November 2018)
 Valeriano Ibañez Abello Chapter No. 3 (Est. 25 August 2019)
 Rajah Sulayman Chapter No. 4 (Est. 15 September 2019)
 General Simeon A. Ola Chapter No. 5 (Est. 25 September 2019)
 Papa Isio Chapter No. 6 (Est. 26 October 2019)
 Agapito-Garcia Chapter No. 7 (Est. 10 November 2019)
 Pablo “Ambing” Magtajas Chapter No. 8 (Est. 16 November 2019)
 Antonio Rios Torillo Chapter No. 9 (Est. 01 March 2020)
Jose Maria Panganiban Chapter No. 10 (Est. 26 January 2021)
Arsenio Nicasio Luz Chapter No. 11 (Est. 26 January 2021)
Felipe-Marcela Agoncillo Chapter No. 12 (Est. 26 January 2021)
Agustin Sumuroy Chapter No. 13 (Est. 26 January 2021)
Colonel Maximo Abad Chapter No. 14 (Est. 26 January 2021)
Rajah Kolambu Chapter No. 15 (Est. 26 January 2021)
Datu Bago Chapter No. 16 (Est. 26 January 2021)
San Pedro Calungsod Chapter No. 17 (Est. 27 February 2022)
Hen. Vicente "Kalentong" Leyba Chapter No. 18
Hen. Agueda Kahabagan y Iniquinto Chapter No. 19

Petitioning Chapters: 

 Baguio City
 Eastern Pangasinan
 Tarlac Province
 Angeles City 
 Antique Province
 Tagum City
 Cotabato City

NESAPh 2020 
Eagle Scouts can expect worthwhile activities and events from NESAPh anchored with BSP's programme thrusts and flagship activities, viz:

 Membership Growth. NESAPh will once again fly and land into different islands of the Philippine archipelago to charter  new local chapters, as well as sharing its best practices. NESAPh will also mandate its existing local chapters to establish and sponsor a community-based Senior Scout Outfit in support to BSP's Membership Growth Programme, which will also serve as NESAPh's pool of future Eagle Scout members. Ultimately, NESAPh members will not be allowed to renew their annual membership unless show proof of registration to the Boy Scouts of the Philippines.
 Tree Planting. NESAPh will conduct tree planting and parenting programmes, as well as establishing tree nurseries to contribute in environmental protection and reforestation programmes of the Department of Environment and Natural Resources, and in support to BSP's Go Green Programme.
 Road Safety. NESAPh will initiate seminar-workshops, as well as information dissemination campaigns on road safety. This will enable Scouts and non-Scouts to be well informed with traffic rules and regulations, and participate into decision-making processes in easing heavy traffic and lessening of road accidents.
 Scouts4SDGs. NESAPh will integrate the United Nations 17 Sustainable Development Goals thru community service projects and initiatives. This will allow Scouts and non-Scouts to participate in nation-building, and contribute to a better world.
 BSP Advancement Scheme. NESAPh will collaborate and support Local BSP Councils in initiating Seminar-Workshops related to BSP's Advancement Scheme, Merit Badge Counselor's Accreditation, different levels of Board of Reviews, and assisting to Advancement Camps.
 Active mitigation responses in COVID-19 pandemic.

All these activities and events of NESAPh is in accordance with the responsibilities stated on the Memorandum of Agreement signed with the Boy Scouts of the Philippines. This proves that NESAPh Members are fully committed and responsible to its Oath.

References 

Scouting-related associations
Scouting in the Philippines